Relikt may refer to:

 RELIKT-1, a Soviet cosmic microwave background anisotropy experiment on board the Prognoz 9 satellite
 Relikt explosive reactive armour for military vehicles, an improved version of Kontakt-5